Nekki may refer to:

Companies
Nekki, a video game studio that developed Shadow Fight and Vector

Fictional characters
Nekki, a character in Samurai Pizza Cats
Basara Nekki, a character in Macross 7

People with the given name
Nekki Shutt, founder of SC Equality

See also

Neklan (name), a Czech given name for which Nekky is one possible nickname